Leptosiphon septentrionalis is a species of flowering plant in the phlox family known by the common name northern linanthus.

Distribution
It is found in Western Canada, the Northwestern United States, and the Great Basin region in eastern California, Nevada, and Utah.

It grows in several types of habitat, including sagebrush scrub, Pinyon-juniper woodlands, and Yellow pine forests.

Description
The leaves are divided into tiny threadlike lobes.

The bloom period is May to July.

External links
 Calflora Database: Leptosiphon septentrionalis (Northern linanthus)
 Jepson Manual eFlora (TJM2) treatment of Leptosiphon septentrionalis
UC CalPhotos gallery: Leptosiphon septentrionalis

septentrionalis
Flora of Western Canada
Flora of the Northwestern United States
Flora of California
Flora of the Great Basin
Flora without expected TNC conservation status